Volunthai: Volunteers for Thailand, founded in 2000, was one of the first international volunteer organizations to take advantage of the internet to bring volunteers to home stay in rural Southeast Asia. The project brings young volunteers to rural schools in Thailand to teach English for a month or longer. Unlike many volunteer projects that charge high fees to join, Volunthai has remained a true non-profit organization and keeps costs as low as possible. Around 100 people join Volunthai each year, mainly from America, Canada, and England. Articles about Volunthai have appeared in The Washington Post, The Nation, and the Bangkok Post.

External links
Volunthai's website

References 

Non-profit organizations based in Thailand